Combles is a commune in the Somme department in Hauts-de-France in northern France.

Geography

History

Combles was the operations centre for the battle of Bapaume during the  Franco-Prussian War of 1870–71.

Combles was again at the centre of much fighting during World War I (1914–1918), with many of its buildings damaged and many of its residents injured or killed, not to mention the numerous casualties among the forces in combat there. Many British soldiers who fell in the war are buried in the local cemetery, and there are numerous war cemeteries in the immediate surrounding area.

It has, however, been substantially developed since the war's end.

Population

See also
Communes of the Somme department

References

External links

 Combles on the Quid website 

Communes of Somme (department)